The Seetal valley is a valley in central Switzerland.

Seetal may also refer to:
 The Seetal railway line in central Switzerland
 The SEETAL art show and competition held in Meisterschwanden, Switzerland